James Tray  (February 14, 1860 – July 28, 1905) was a Major League Baseball catcher for the 1884 Indianapolis Hoosiers. He played in the minors through 1889.

External links
Baseball-Reference page

1860 births
1905 deaths
19th-century baseball players
Baseball players from Michigan
Major League Baseball catchers
Major League Baseball first basemen
Indianapolis Hoosiers (AA) players
Bay City (minor league baseball) players
Saginaw Greys players
Birmingham (minor league baseball) players
St. Paul Freezers players
Kalamazoo Kazoos players
Jackson Jaxons players